Antoine Cornil (born 2 February 1998) is a Belgian volleyball player, a member of the club Knack Randstad Roeselare.

Sporting achievements

Clubs 
Belgian Cup:
  2018, 2019
Belgium Championship:
  2018, 2019
Belgian SuperCup:
  2018

References

External links
Volleybox profile
CEV profile

1992 births
Living people
Belgian men's volleyball players